The Netherlands national beach soccer team represents the Netherlands in international beach soccer competitions and is controlled by the Royal Dutch Football Association, the governing body for football in the Netherlands.

Competitive record

FIFA Beach Soccer World Cup Qualification (UEFA)

Current squad
Correct as of July 2016

Coach:   Matteo Marrucci

Current staff
 Technical Assistant: Roël Liefden
 Team Manager: Danny de Jong

Achievements
 FIFA Beach Soccer World Cup Best: Eighth place
 1995
 Euro Beach Soccer League Best: Runners-up
 2008

References

External links
 BSWW Profile

European national beach soccer teams
Beach soccer